Arumaithurai Tharmaletchumi was a minority Sri Lankan Tamil woman aged 17 who was raped and killed by Sri Lankan Government Armed forces in Kumarapuram in Trincomalee on 11 February 1996, and who became a cause célèbre of the Sri Lankan civil war because of this.

The incident
Tharmaletchumi went to bring her neighbor Moses Vijaya's son Antony Joseph from tuition in Killiveddy and while riding back she was taken to a milk collection centre and raped and murdered. Antony Joseph who tried to stop this was also shot.

Government Investigation
There has been no progress in the case and no one has been convicted.

See also
Sexual violence against Tamils in Sri Lanka
Ilayathambi Tharsini
Ida Carmelitta
Sarathambal
Krishanti Kumaraswamy

References

1996 deaths
Deaths by firearm in Sri Lanka
People murdered in Sri Lanka
Rape in Sri Lanka
Sri Lankan murder victims
Sri Lankan Tamil people
Year of birth missing
1996 murders in Sri Lanka
Child sexual abuse in Sri Lanka
Incidents of violence against girls